Pradyut Bordoloi is an Indian  Politician from the state of Assam, currently serving as a Member of Parliament for Nowgong constituency. Indian National Congress candidate and former Minister of State Pradyut Bordoloi, breached the BJP bastion of Nowgong, by defeating party MLA Rupak Sharma by 16,752 votes in the Lok Sabha Elections held in 2019.

He was a member of the Assam Legislative Assembly from Indian National Congress. He became a minister in the Tarun Gogoi led government. He was a Member of Legislative Assembly from Margherita. He was also spokesperson of the state government in Tarun Gogoi government until 2016. He had been elected four consecutive times for Margherita.

Previously, he was also the President of National Students’ Union of India in Assam. He was minister of state for home affairs and later promoted as minister of state with independent charge for environment and forest, Bordoloi also was a Cabinet minister for power, industries and commerce.

References 

1958 births
Living people
Indian National Congress politicians from Assam
State cabinet ministers of Assam
Members of the Assam Legislative Assembly
People from Tinsukia district
Assam MLAs 2006–2011
India MPs 2019–present